Jack Kenneth Loney (21 October 1925 – 13 February 1995) was an amateur Australian marine historian who published over one hundred books and numerous newspaper and magazine articles. He was a schoolteacher and principal until his retirement. He became interested in maritime history after preparing several general history booklets covering the Otway region of western Victoria, Australia.

Personal life
Loney lived throughout his life in Portarlington, Victoria with his wife Padge. He had two children, Peter and Sally.

Jack Loney Award
Loney was an inaugural and long-standing member of the Victorian Governments Historic Shipwrecks Advisory Committee (HSAC); the Victorian government decreed a perpetual memorial award - called the Jack Loney Award - for outstanding contribution to maritime history in recognition of Loney's contribution to the preservation of Australia's shipwreck and maritime heritage. The Award is made only as occasion demands, with the recipient chosen by the Victorian Historic Shipwrecks Advisory Committee to the Heritage Council. Winners have included:
 1998: Peter Stone, in recognition of his outstanding contribution to the preservation of Australia's maritime heritage through his community role as a maritime and dive adventure writer, lobbyist, publisher and photographer.
 2000: Terry Arnott, in recognition of his services to Victoria's maritime heritage at the Australian Institute for Maritime Archaeology (AIMA) and Australasian Society for Historical Archaeology (ASHA).
 2004: Peter Ronald, the former Victorian Heritage Council member and Victorian Historic Shipwrecks Advisory Committee Chairman, for long-standing contribution to the protection of Victoria's historic shipwrecks and as an advocate of maritime heritage in the state.
 2009: Dr Leonie Foster, for her groundbreaking research, long-standing committee membership, and mentoring of maritime heritage professionals in Australia.
2010: Peter Taylor, shipwreck diver and maritime historian

Bibliography

Australian shipwrecks series
As an amateur maritime historian he took over the writing and publishing of the most comprehensive reference series of books on maritime disasters in Australia from Charles Bateson the Australian Shipwrecks series.
 Australian shipwrecks Vol. 1 1622–1850 By Charles Bateson. Sydney. Reed, 1972 910.4530994 BAT 
Australian shipwrecks Vol. 2 1851–1871 By Loney, J. K. (Jack Kenneth), 1925–1995. Sydney. Reed, 1980 910.4530994 LON
Australian shipwrecks Vol. 3 1871–1900 By Loney, J. K. (Jack Kenneth), 1925–1995. Geelong Vic: List Publishing, 1982 910.4530994 LON 
Australian shipwrecks Vol. 4 1901–1986 By Loney, J. K. (Jack Kenneth), 1925–1995. Portarlington Vic. Marine History Publications, 1987 910.4530994 LON 
Australian shipwrecks Vol. 5 Update 1986 By Loney, J. K. (Jack Kenneth), 1925–1995. Portarlington Vic. Marine History Publications, 1991 910.4530994 LON

Other works
A selection of his many other books and smaller booklets includes:
Admella
Adventures with shipwrecks, an account of wrecks in the Apollo Bay Area 
An era at Port Phillip Heads: 1830–1900
Apollo Bay : tourist and fishing guide
The Australia run
Australia's island shipwrecks
Australia's shipwreck coast and other stories 
Australian sea mysteries
Australian sea stories
Bay steamers and coastal ferries
Ben Boyd's ships 
Clipper Lightning in Geelong, 1862-1869 
Early shipping in the Port of Geelong
Falls of Halladale 
Famous wrecks
Great Ocean Road, tourist and historical guide
High & dry: visible wrecks and wreckage in Australian waters
The historic Barwon
Jack Loney's maritime Australia, short tales of ships and men
King Island: tourist and historical guide 
Lady Bay, Warrnambool: a graveyard of ships
The Loch Ard disaster
The mahogany ship
Mysteries of the Bass Strait triangle
Not enough grass to feed a single bullock: a history of Tarwin Lower Venus Bay and Waratah
Notes on the Otway  
Old days and ways along the South Coast: tales from the surf and shipwreck coasts 
Otway 1919-1969
Otway and its coast in retrospect
Otway memories
Peterborough, Port Campbell, Princetown: tourist, historical and fishing guide 
Pioneering days: a collection of short articles prepared by the author, J.K. Loney, during his years at Apollo Bay (1954-1971)
Port Fairy, tourist, historical and fishing guide
The price of admiralty: ships of the R.A.N. lost, 1914-1974
The Queenscliff lifeboat wreck and rescue at Port Phillip Heads
Queenscliff, Point Lonsdale: tourist and historical guide
Ramblers guide to west coast shipwrecks
Sea adventures and wrecks on the N.S.W. south coast
The Seahorse Inn
Sea war in Bass Strait 
Ships and seamen off the south coast
Ships and shipwrecks at Port Albert
Ships and shipwrecks at Portarlington
Ships at Port Welshpool and other memories
Ships in Corio Bay, Geelong 1840-1980  
Shipwreck strait: an illustrated history of major shipwrecks, collisions, fires and strandings in Bass Strait from 1797
Shipwrecks along the Great Ocean Road
Shipwrecks and sea adventures around Wilsons Promontory
Shipwrecks on Kangaroo Island 
Shomberg incident
Some overseas shipping arrivals in Melbourne and Geelong, 1856-1860
South Coast story: Torquay, Barwon Heads, Ocean Grove, Point Lonsdale, Queenscliff
Stranding of R.M.S. Australia
Tales from the surf coast, shipwreck coast and their hinterlands 
Tall ships and sailormen : a concise survey of Victoria's early maritime history
Twelve decades: a short history of Apollo Bay, 1850-1969
Victims of the Corsair rock
Victorian shipwrecks; all wrecks in Victorian waters and Bass Strait, including King Island and the Kent group
Victoria's West Coast steamers
Warrnambool the graveyard of ships, wrecks and strandings in and around Lady Bay
Wreck - 1891 and other maritime memories
Wreck and rescue at Port Phillip Heads
Wreck of the Fiji
Wreck of the Ly-e-Moon
Wreck of the ship Eric The Red
Wreck of the S.S. Casino
Wrecks along the Murray 
Wrecks at Hell's Gates
Wrecks at Robe
Wrecks on Phillip Island
Wrecks on South Australia's south-east coast: shipwrecks and strandings from Port Macdonnell to the Murray River
Wrecks on South Australia's southern coastline
Wrecks on the Gippsland coast
Wrecks on the Gippsland coast: a survey of major incidents from Point Nepean to Cape Howe, and nearer islands of Bass Strait; including Westernport, Anderson's Inlet, Waratah Bay, Kent Group, Corner Inlet, Port Albert, Lakes Entrance, Lake Tyers, Marlo, Sydenham Inlet, Mallacoota and Gabo Island 
Wrecks on the New South Wales coast
Wrecks on the Queensland coast, 1791-1992: includes Great Barrier Reef, Coral Sea, Torres Strait, Gulf of Carpentaria 
Wrecks on the South Australian coast: including Kangaroo Island 
Wrecks on Victoria's south west coast; a survey of incidents from the Victorian-South Australian border to Lady Bay, including Portland, Port Fairy, and Warrnambool 
Wrecks on the Western Australian coast: and Northern Territory
Wrecks in Australian waters : an illustrated survey of shipwrecks, fires, collisions and strandings on the Australian coast from 1629
Wrecks in the Furneaux Group (Flinders Island) 
Wreckers, smugglers and pirates in South Eastern Australian waters
Wrecks along the Gippsland coast
Wrecks around Cape Otway: shipwrecks and strandings from Port Campbell to Anglesea
Wrecks at Apollo Bay
Wrecks in Port Phillip Bay 
Wrecks in the Rip
Wrecks on King Island
Yambulla gold : a brief record of the colourful Yambulla goldrush, near Eden

References

Australian maritime historians
Otway Ranges
1925 births
1995 deaths
20th-century Australian historians